Christmas Through Your Eyes is the fourth solo studio album, and 16th overall, by Latin-American singer Gloria Estefan, released on September 27, 1993 by Epic Records. It is also Estefan's first Christmas album.

History 
Following the success of her multi-awarded Latin album Mi Tierra, Estefan recorded a collection of all Christmas songs released in the early autumn of 1993. The collection contains mostly traditional songs along with the title track, an original song written by Estefan and Diane Warren. The title track was previously released with a different instrumental arrangement on Estefan's 1992 Greatest Hits album, and it was released as a double A-side single with "Miami Hitmix" in Europe.
The Spanish-language song called "Arbolito de Navidad" is also included.

Estefan, who had found worldwide success singing pop and dance songs, was accompanied by a big band on the song "Let It Snow! Let It Snow! Let It Snow!" and sings a jazz-inspired rendition of "This Christmas". Music videos were filmed and released for the songs "This Christmas" and "Silent Night", which are included on the video collection Everlasting Gloria!.

Technologically, the album production was used as a testing ground for what would be the digital long-distance audio technology used in the production of the Frank Sinatra album Duets using the Dolby Digital system provided by Skywalker Ranch-based Entertainment Digital Network, so that Estefan could remotely listen to the production sessions in Los Angeles from her home studio in Miami. Both the Estefan and Sinatra album were produced by Phil Ramone and principally recorded and mixed by Eric Schilling.

Track listing

Personnel 
Adapted from AllMusic.

Musicians 

 Gloria Estefan – vocal, background vocals
 Rene Toledo – guitar
 Warren Luening – trumpet
 George Graham – trumpet
 Larry Hall – trumpet
 Charles Davis – trumpet
 James Thatcher – French horn
 Kurt Snyder – French horn
 Marilyn Johnson – French horn
 Calvin Smith – French horn
 William Waltous – trombone
 Charles Loper – trombone
 William Reichenbach – trombone
 Donald Wadrop – tuba
 Dorothy Remsen – harp
 Jerry Williams – percussion
 Alan Esters – percussion
 Gerald Vinci – violin
 Norma Leonard – violin
 Assa Drori – violin
 Don Palmer – violin
 Dixie Blackstone – violin
 Robert Sanov – violin
 Patricia Aiken – violin
 Miran Kojan – violin
 Jay Rosen – violin

 Kwihee Shamban – violin
 Patricia Johnson – violin
 Bette Bryers – violin
 Jennifer Johnson – violin
 Kenneth Yerke – violin
 James Ross – viola
 Margot MacLaine – viola
 Rick Gerding – viola
 Carrie Holzman-Little – viola
 Gloria Strassner – cello
 Anna Karam – cello
 Danny Little – cello
 Nancy Stein-Ross – cello
 Kenneth Wild – bass
 Drew Dembowski – bass
 Susan Ranney – bass
 Gene Cipriano – woodwinds
 Susan Ranney – woodwinds
 Geraldine Rotella – woodwinds
 Brice Martin – woodwinds
 Luoise DiTullio – woodwinds
 Larry Dermer – keyboards
 Juanito Marquez – acoustic guitar
 The American Boys Choir – chorus
 Rob Mounsey – keyboards, programming, background vocals

Production 

 Patrick Williams – arranger, conductor
 Juanito Márquez – arranger, guitar (acoustic), producer, programming
 Doug Katsaros – arranger, producer, programming, background vocals
 Rob Mounsey – arranger, producer, programming, background vocals
 Clay Ostwald – arranger, producer, programming
 Peter "Ski" Schwartz – arranger, producer, programming
 David Coleman – art direction
 David Daoud Coleman – art direction
 Sebastián Krys – assistant engineer, mixing, mixing assistant
 Leslie Ann Jones – assistant engineer
 Charles Paakkari – assistant engineer
 Neil Perry – assistant engineer
 Bob Ludwing – mastering at Gateway Mastering, Portland, Maine
 Emilio Estefan Jr. – management

Design 
 David Coleman – art direction
 Alberto Tolot – photography

Release history

Charts and certifications 
The album went to No. 43 on the Billboard 200 Pop Album chart and was certified Platinum by the RIAA in the United States for shipments of over a million copies.

Chart performance

Certifications

References 

Gloria Estefan albums
Albums produced by Phil Ramone
1993 Christmas albums
Christmas albums by American artists
Pop Christmas albums